Gwynedd Rae (born 23 July 1892, Gipsy Hill, Norwood, Surrey – died 14 November 1977, Tott Close, Burwash, Sussex, aged 85), daughter of George Bentham Rae, stockbroker (born 1846, Birkenhead) and Mary Victorine Rae (born 1858, San Francisco, US), was the author of children's books about a bear called Mary Plain. Her stories were read on BBC Radio Children's Hour in the 1930s and by Richard Briers on BBC TV's Jackanory in 1969.

Publications in date order
1930: Mostly Mary
1931: All Mary
1934: And Timothy Too. [A novel.]
1935: Leap Year Born
1935: Mary Plain in Town
1937: Mary Plain on Holiday
1940: Mary Plain in Trouble
1942: Mary Plain in War-Time
1944: Mary Plain's Big Adventure
1949: Mary Plain Home Again
1950: Mary Plain to the Rescue
1951: Mary Plain, V.I.P.
1952: Mary Plain and the Twins
1954: Mary Plain goes bob-a-jobbing
1957: Mary Plain goes to America
1965: Mary Plain's "Whodunit"

Books by Gwynedd Rae, held by the British Library, in alphabetical order
All Mary ... Illustrated, etc. E. Mathews & Marrot: London, 1931.
All Mary ... With illustrations by Irene Williamson. Cobden-Sanderson: London, 1938.
All Mary; illustrated by Janina Ede. Brockhampton P, 1968. Series: Red knight books 
All Mary; with illustrations by Irene Williams. Rev. ed. London : Owl Man, 1995. 
And Timothy Too. [A novel.] . Blackie & Son: London & Glasgow, 1934.
Leap Year Born.  pp. 281. Blackie & Son: London & Glasgow, 1935.
Mary Plain and the Twins ... With illustrations by Irene Williamson. Routledge & Kegan Paul: London, 1952.
Mary Plain and the twins, illustrated by Janina Ede. Leicester : Knight Books, 1970. Series: ( A red knight book).  (pbk)
Mary Plain goes bob-a-jobbing ... With illustrations by Irene Williamson. Routledge & Kegan Paul: London, 1954.
Mary Plain goes to America ... With illustrations by Irene Williamson. Routledge & Kegan Paul: London, 1957.
Mary Plain goes to America; illustrated by Janina Ede.Leicester : Knight Books, 1971. Series: A Red Knight book)  (pbk)
Mary Plain Home Again ... With illustrations by Irene Williamson.  Routledge & Kegan Paul: London, 1949 [1948].
Mary Plain in Town ... With illustrations by Irene Williamson. Cobden-Sanderson: London, 1935.
Mary Plain in Trouble ... With illustrations by Irene Williamson. G. Routledge & Sons: London, 1940.
Mary Plain in War-Time, etc. G. Routledge & Sons: London, 1942.
The Mary Plain omnibus; illustrated by Irene Williamson. London : Routledge and Kegan Paul, 1976. Contents: Mostly Mary - All Mary - Mary Plain in town - Mary Plain on holiday. 
Mary Plain on Holiday ... With illustrations by Irene Williamson. Cobden-Sanderson: London, 1937.
Mary Plain on holiday; illustrated by Janina Ede. London : Knight Books, 1969. Series: A red knight book
Mary Plain to the Rescue. With illustrations by Irene Williamson.Routledge & Kegan Paul: London, 1950.
Mary Plain to the rescue; illustrated by Janina Ede.Leicester : Knight Books, 1971. Series: Red knight book   (pbk)
Mary Plain, V.I.P. ... With illustrations by Irene Williamson.. Routledge & Kegan Paul: London, 1961.
Mary Plain's Big Adventure ... With illustrations by Irene Williamson, G. Routledge & Sons: London, 1944
Mary Plain's big adventure; illustrated by Janina Ede.,Leicester : Knight Books, 1970. Series: Red Knight book  (pbk)
Mary Plain's "Whodunit" ... With illustrations by Irene Williamson. Routledge & Kegan Paul: London, 1965.
Mostly Mary ... Illustrated, etc. E. Mathews & Marrot: London, 1930
Mostly Mary With illustrations by Irene Williamson, Cobden-Sanderson: London, 1938.
Mostly Mary, illustrated by Janina Ede.  Brockhampton P, 1968. Series:  Red Knight books.
Mostly Mary, with illustrations by Irene Williams. Rev. ed. London: The Owl Man, 1995.

References

External links

British children's writers
1977 deaths
1892 births